Azimuth is an angular measurement in a spherical coordinate system. 

Azimuth may also refer to:

 Azimuth (airline), a Russian airline
 Azimuth (band), a British jazz trio active from 1977 to 2000
 Azimuth (album), the trio's debut album
 Azimuth Hill, Antarctica
 Azimuth Islands, Antarctica
 Azimuth Systems, an American wireless technology company
 General Alister Azimuth, a character in the Ratchet & Clank video game series

See also